Ang Panday 2, also known as Panday Ang Ikalawang Yugto is a 2011 Filipino fantasy film directed by Mac Alejandre.  Starring Ramon 'Bong' Revilla Jr., Marian Rivera, Phillip Salvador, and Eddie Garcia, the film was entered in the 2011 Metro Manila Film Festival (MMFF).  It was released in theaters nationwide on December 25, 2011, by GMA Pictures and Imus Productions.

Cast
Ramon 'Bong' Revilla Jr. as Flavio/Panday
Marian Rivera as Arlana/Bagwis
Phillip Salvador as Lizardo 
Eddie Garcia as Daluyong 
Iza Calzado as Maria
Rhian Ramos as Emelita
Alden Richards as Hubli 
Kris Bernal as Alira Naswen
Lorna Tolentino as Baruha 
Alice Dixson as Ibira 
Robert Villar  as Bugoy
Benjie Paras as Alulod
Lucy Torres-Gomez as Ina Engkantada 
Joonee Gamboa as Lolo Isko
Mark Lapid as Kapitan 
Sheena Halili
Yogo Singh
Bea Binene
Jake Vargas
Barbie Forteza 
Alyssa Alano 
King Gutierrez
Mon Confiado as Taumbayan
Ana Feleo
Amay Bisaya
Len-Len Frial as Gelay

Release

Box office
Ang Panday 2 earned ₱29 million on its opening day. By January 9, 2012, it was the third-highest earning film at the box office among the seven entries of the 37th MMFF, after Enteng ng Ina Mo and Segunda Mano.

Accolades

References

External links

Panday
2011 films
2011 fantasy films
Films based on Philippine comics
Live-action films based on comics
Philippine fantasy films
Philippine films based on comics
2010s Tagalog-language films
Films directed by Mac Alejandre